Paisley South was a constituency of the Scottish Parliament (Holyrood). It elected one Member of the Scottish Parliament (MSP) by the first past the post method of election. It was also one of nine constituencies in the West of Scotland electoral region, which elected seven additional members, in addition to nine constituency MSPs, to produce a form of proportional representation for the region as a whole.

Paisley South was replaced by Paisley for the Scottish Parliament election, 2011.

Electoral region 
See also West of Scotland (Scottish Parliament electoral region)

The other eight constituencies of the West of Scotland region were: Dumbarton, Clydebank and Milngavie, Cunninghame North, Eastwood, Greenock and Inverclyde, Paisley North, Strathkelvin and Bearsden and West Renfrewshire.

The region covers the West Dunbartonshire council area, the East Renfrewshire council area, the Inverclyde council area, most of the Renfrewshire council area, most of the East Dunbartonshire council area, part of the Argyll and Bute council area and part of the North Ayrshire council area.

Constituency boundaries 

The Paisley South constituency was created at the same time as the Scottish Parliament, in 1999, with the name and boundaries of an  existing Westminster constituency. In 2005, however, the Westminster (House of Commons) constituency was abolished in favour of new constituencies.

Council areas 

The Holyrood constituency was entirely within the Renfrewshire council area. The rest of the Renfrewshire area was covered by the Paisley North and West Renfrewshire.

The West Renfrewshire constituency also covered a portion of the Inverclyde council area.

Member of the Scottish Parliament

Election results

Notes and references 

Scottish Parliament constituencies and regions 1999–2011
Politics of Paisley, Renfrewshire
1999 establishments in Scotland
Constituencies established in 1999
2011 disestablishments in Scotland
Constituencies disestablished in 2011
Johnstone
Politics of Renfrewshire